Whose Life Is It Anyway? is a 1981 American drama film directed by John Badham and starring Richard Dreyfuss. It was adapted by Brian Clark and Reginald Rose from Clark's 1972 television movie and 1978 stage play, all under the same title. Whose Life Is It Anyway? received a 70% fresh rating on Rotten Tomatoes, based on 10 reviews and an average rating of 6.58/10.

Plot
Set in Boston, this film features sculptor Ken Harrison (played by Richard Dreyfuss), who becomes paralyzed from the neck down after a car accident. He is no longer able to use his hands, create art, walk, feed himself, make love, or have any semblance of a normal existence. Because he cannot pursue any of his passions any more, and because he will likely need medical help for the rest of his life, he wants to end his life. However, he is physically unable to commit suicide... so he looks to end his life in other ways... all of which would require his body to be discharged from the hospital. He asks for this from Dr Emerson, the hospital administrator (played by John Cassavetes), and he refuses; Emerson is staunchly opposed to euthanasia, and is determined to keep his patient alive—even against his wishes.

He dumps his girlfriend, who is initially distraught, but eventually accepts that their relationship could not realistically continue, and accepts his decision to end his life.

Harrison hires Carter Hill (played by Bob Balaban), a lawyer—who is at first reluctant to represent him, but eventually does so. Harrison legally petitions the hospital for the right to end his life.

Claire Scott, Harrison's sympathetic physician (played by Christine Lahti), eventually develops personal feelings for Harrison. She wants to keep him alive, even though Harrison's girlfriend, Pat, accepted his decision to end his life.

A young male orderly and a young female nurse at the hospital do what they can to keep Harrison's spirits up—even wheeling him to the hospital basement in the wee hours of the night, where they treat him to a live reggae concert and marijuana.

The film's climax is a legal hearing that determines if Harrison has a moral, ethical and legal right to choose to end his own life, on his own terms.

Cast
 Richard Dreyfuss as Ken Harrison
 John Cassavetes as Dr. Emerson
 Christine Lahti as Claire Scott
 Bob Balaban as Carter Hill
 Thomas Carter as John
 Kaki Hunter as Mary Jo
 Kenneth McMillan as Judge Wyler
 Janet Eilber as Pat

See also
The Sea Inside

References

External links
 
 
 
 

1981 films
1981 drama films
American drama films
Films about euthanasia
Films about paraplegics or quadriplegics
Films directed by John Badham
Films set in hospitals
Metro-Goldwyn-Mayer films
Films with screenplays by Reginald Rose
Films scored by Arthur B. Rubinstein
United Artists films
Films about suicide
1980s English-language films
1980s American films
Films about disability